Castanea seguinii, called Seguin chestnut, Seguin's chestnut, or Chinese chinquapin (a name it shares with Castanea henryi), and in , mao li, is a species of chestnut native to southcentral and southeast China.

Description
Castanea seguinii are small trees or shrubs, rarely reaching 12m. Their stipules are narrowly lanceolate, 0.7 to 1.5cm long, and are shed (become deciduous) when the plant is in fruit. Leaf petioles are 0.5 to 1.5cm long. Leaves are 6 to 14cm long, with their abaxial sides covered with yellowishbrown to gray scaly glands, and have sparse hairs along the veins when young. Leaf blades are oblongobovate to ellipticoblong in shape, with bases rounded or infrequently subcordate, but cuneate when young, with acuminate apices. Leaf margins are coarsely serrate. Male inflorescences are 5 to 12cm long and catkinlike. Female inflorescences are held in a cupule, with one to two (rarely more) flowers in each. Cupules are 3 to 5cm wide, and covered with sparsely pilose spiny bracts which are 6 to 10mm long. Each cupule produces two or three nuts, rarely more, with each nut being 1.5 to 2.0cm in diameter.

Ecology

Castanea seguinii grow in mixed mesophytic forests and thickets from 400 to 2000m in elevation. Their bark is eaten by golden snubnosed monkeys (Rhinopithecus roxellana) in winter. In their native habitat they flower in May through July, and fruit from September to November.

Uses
Its nuts are small, but are edible and occasionally cultivated or collected in the wild and consumed by locals. Locals also practice coppicing for firewood. Another use in China is as a trap crop for Dryocosmus kuriphilus gall wasps. By planting a hedge of C.seguinii around C.mollissima (Chinese chestnut) orchards, the wasps will first encounter and attack the buds of the less valuable C. seguinii, allowing the galled twigs to be cut off and destroyed.

References

seguinii
Endemic flora of China
Trees of China
Plants described in 1908